Oleh Yanchenko (born 17 April 1979) is a Ukrainian diver. He competed in the men's 10 metre platform event at the 1996 Summer Olympics.

References

1979 births
Living people
Ukrainian male divers
Olympic divers of Ukraine
Divers at the 1996 Summer Olympics
Place of birth missing (living people)